Sarah... Ang Munting Prinsesa (Tagalog: Sarah, The Little Princess) is a 1995 Filipino family-drama film which in turn was based on the 1905 children's novel A Little Princess by British playwright and author Frances Hodgson Burnett. The film was directed by Romy Suzara and starred Camille Prats as Sarah Crewe, Angelica Panganiban as Becky and Jean Garcia as Ms. Minchin.

Plot
Sarah Crewe (Prats), who was born in India, is sent to a boarding school in England, leaving her life in India and her father, Captain Crewe (Ranillo III). Life is rather hard for Sarah, so he bought her a doll named Emily.

Sarah quickly became the center of attention at school and befriends almost all students, even the school's scullery maid, Becky (Panganiban). The rich yet selfish Lavinia Herbert (Pedersen), who was once the most popular girl in school, grows jealous of Sarah.

Sarah is then informed during her birthday party that her father died in a mining accident. Out of greed, Miss Minchin (García) locked Sarah away in the attic, taking her possessions and forcing her into servitude to make her earn her keep, telling people outside that the girl had disappeared. Upon the downfall of her perceived rival, a gloating Lavinia and her coterie of girls then torment Sarah and Becky.

In the end, her father's friend discovers that Sarah, the person they were searching for a very long time, just lives next door, eventually adopting the girl to repay her father's kindness of saving himself. However, Miss Minchin and Lavinia feels remorseful of their cruel actions and asks Sarah for forgiveness for all the cruelties they inflict against her.

Cast

Main cast
 Camille Prats as Sarah Crewe
 Angelica Panganiban as Becky
 Jean Garcia as Miss Minchin
 Angelica Pedersen as Lavinia Herbert
 Mat Ranillo III as Captain Ralph Crewe
 Rio Locsin as Miss Amelia

Supporting cast
 Paula Peralejo as Gertrude
 Romeo Rivera as Mr. Anthony Crisford (based on the original Mr. Carrisford)
 Romy Romulo as Ram Dass, Mr. Crisford's Indian servant
 Tony Carreón as Señor Francisco (a Spanish teacher based on the original French teacher, Monsieur Dufarge)
 Ramón Recto as Mr. Barrow
 Jaime Fábregas as James, the school cook
 Malou Crisólogo as Miss Mollie
 Kathleen Go Quien as Ermengarde St. John
 Ani Pearl Alonzo as Lottie Leigh
 Sara Polverini as Jessie
 Ryan de Vela as Peter
 Alex Symington as Peter's father
 Sarah Asher Geronimo as Sarah's classmate
 Hilda Levantolia as Nuni Muni

Production
Most of the film was shot on location in Scotland, with other scenes shot on set in Baguio, Philippines.

A departure from the original novel and the anime are that the girls taught Spanish as a foreign language instead of French.

Reception
Upon its release, the film and its cast earned a number of accolades, among them a 1996 FAMAS Awards nomination for Camille Pratts as Best Child Actress, Best Production Design for Manny Morfe, and a Best Child Actress award for Angelica Panganiban during the 1996 Star Awards.

See also
 A Little Princess - 1995 American film also based on the novel.
 Princess Sarah - live action TV adaptation of the film.

References

External links
 

Star Cinema films
Philippine children's films
Films based on A Little Princess
Films about educators
Tagalog-language films
Films set in India
Films shot in Scotland
1990s Spanish-language films
1990s Hindi-language films
1995 films
Films about orphans
Films set in 1890
1995 multilingual films
Philippine multilingual films
Films directed by Romy Suzara
Films set in the British Raj